This is a discography of the Carter Family - Sara Carter, her husband A.P. Carter, and their sister-in-law Maybelle Carter - often cited as "the most influential group in country music history": (For recordings by the second generation of the Carter Family see The Carter Sisters.)

Singles

Selected 78 rpm records
The Carter Family's career predated any sort of best-selling chart of country music records. (Billboard did not have a country best sellers chart until 1944.)  Below is a select list of their 78 rpm releases.

Bluebird Records
 "Anchored in Love"
 "I'll Be All Smiles Tonight"
 "Keep on the Sunny Side"
 "Little Moses"
 "Mid the Green Fields of Virginia"
 "My Clinch Mountain Home"
 "Picture on the Wall"
 "Wabash Cannonball"
 "Wildwood Flower"
 "Worried Man Blues"
Montgomery Ward Records
 "Lonesome Pine Special"
 "Two Sweethearts"
 "Where We'll Never Grow Old"
Decca Records
 "Coal Miner Blues"
 "Hello Stranger"
 "My Dixie Darling"
 "You Are My Flower"

Victor Records
 "Bury Me Beneath the Weeping Willow"
 "Foggy Mountain Top"
 "Gold Watch and Chain"
 "I'm Thinking Tonight of My Blue Eyes"
 "Keep on the Firing Line"
 "My Old Cottage Home"
 "On the Sea of Gallee"
 "The Church in the Wildwood"
 "The Storms Are on the Ocean"

Vocalion Records
 "Broken Hearted Love"
 "Can the Circle Be Unbroken"

Selected vinyl albums
The long-playing album did not debut until several years after the Carter Family disbanded.  Most of the full-length LPs issued under "the Carter Family" were budget albums as was traditional on most vintage recordings.

Rounder CD compilations

Boxed sets

Singles & EPs

River Of Jordan / Keep On the Sunny Side (Shellac, 10")	Victor	21434	1927		
I Have No One To Love Me (Shellac, 10")	Victor	V-40036	1928		
Will You Miss Me When I'm Gone? / Little Darling, Pal Of Mine (Shellac, 10")	Victor	21638	1928		
Engine One-Forty-Three / I'm Thinking To-Night Of My Blue Eyes (Shellac, 10")	Victor	V-40089	1929		
Wildwood Flower / Forsaken Love (Shellac, 10")	Victor	V-40000	1929		
My Clinch Mountain Home / The Foggy Mountain Top (Shellac, 10")	Victor	V-40058	1929		
Worried Man Blues / The Cannon Ball (Shellac, 10")	Victor	V-40317	1930		
Sweet As The Flowers In May Time / If One Won't Another One Will (Shellac, 10", Single)	Victor	23761	1932		
Will The Roses Bloom In Heaven / We Will March Through The Streets Of The City (Shellac, 10")	Bluebird (3)	B-5161	1933		
When The Springtime Comes Again / I'm Thinking To-Night Of My Blue Eyes (Shellac, 10")	Bluebird (3)	B-5122	1933		
Happy Or Lonesome / The East Virginia Blues (Shellac, 10")	Bluebird (3)	B-5650	1934		
Hello, Central! Give Me Heaven / I'll Be All Smiles Tonight (Shellac, 10")	Bluebird (3)	B-5529	1934		
Can the Circle Be Unbroken (By and By) / Glory To The Lamb (Shellac, 10")	Perfect (3)	13155	1935		
	
My Texas Girl (Shellac, 10")	Banner	17481	1935		
He Took A White Rose From Her Hair (Shellac, 10")	Melotone	13429	1935		
Little Darling Pal Of Mine (Shellac, 10")	Romeo	17504	1935		
Diamonds In The Rough / John Hardy Was A Desperate Little Man (Shellac, 10")	Bluebird (3)	B-6033	1935		
Can The Circle Be Unbroken / Glory To The Lamb (Shellac, 10")	Conqueror	8529	1935		
The Homestead On The Farm (Shellac, 10")	Perfect (3)	17520	1937		
Just A Few More Days / Little Joe (Shellac, 10")	Decca	5632	1939		
Wabash Cannonball / I Never Will Marry (Shellac, 10")	Bluebird (3)	B-8350	1939		
Heaven's Radio / Meeting In The Air (Shellac, 10")	Okeh	05931	1940		
The Wave On The Sea / The Rambling Boy (Shellac, 10")	Bluebird (3)	33-0512	1944		
When The World's On Fire / Keep On The Sunny Side (Shellac, 10")	Bluebird (3)	33-0537	1945		
Jealous Hearted Me / Lay My Head Beneath The Rose (Shellac, 10")	Decca	46005	1946		
Picture On The Wall / Keep On The Sunny Side (Shellac, 10")	RCA Victor	20-3259	1948		
Mountain Music Volume 2 (7", EP)	Brunswick	OE 9168	1956		
The Original And Great Carter Family Vol. 3   2 versions	RCA Victor, RCA Victor		1962			
The Original And Great Carter Family Vol. 1 (7", EP, Mono)	RCA Victor	RCX-7100	1962		
The Original And Great Carter Family Vol. 2 (7", EP, Mono)	RCA Victor, RCA Victor	RCX-7101, 45-RCX-7101	1962		
The Original And Great Carter Family Vol. 6 (7", Mono)	RCA Victor	RCX-7111	1963		
The Original And Great Carter Family Vol. 5 (7", EP, Mono)	RCA Victor	RCX-7110	1963		
The Original And Great Carter Family Vol. 4 (7", EP, Mono)	RCA Victor	RCX-7109	1963		
Jealous Hearted Me (7", EP)	Decca	ED 2788	1965		
Anchored In Love (7", EP)	Acme Records (6)	DF-103	Unknown		
The Titanic (7", EP)	Acme Records (6)	DF-102	Unknown		
Sweet Fern (7", EP)	RCA Victor	20369	Unknown		
Get Up Early In The Morning / Fourteen Carat Nothing (7", Promo)	Liberty	F55501	Unknown		
Picture On The Wall / Will You Miss Me When I'm Gone? (Shellac, 10")	Montgomery Ward	M-4228	Unknown		
No More The Moon Shines On Lorena / Jimmie Brow, The Newsboy (Shellac, 10")	Montgomery Ward	m-5027	Unknown		
The Spirit Of Her Watches Over Me / When The Springtime Comes Again (10")	Montgomery Ward	M-4227	Unknown		
Tell Me That You Love Me / I‘m Thinking Tonight Of My Blue Eyes (Shellac, 10")	Montgomery Ward	M-4230	Unknown		
Honey In The Rock (Shellac, 10")	Montgomery Ward	8024	Unknown		
Two Sweethearts / The Broken-hearted Lover (Shellac, 10")	Montgomery Ward	M-4433	Unknown

Albums

Keep On The Sunny Side: In Memory Of A P Carter (LP)	Acme Records (6)	LP No. 2	1961		
The Carter Family Album   3 versions	Liberty		1962		
The Original And Great Carter Family   5 versions	RCA Camden		1962		
The Original And Great Carter Family (LP, Mono)	RCA Camden	CAL 586	1962		
A Collection Of Favorites By The Carter Family   3 versions	Decca		1963		
Great Original Recordings By The Carter Family (LP, Album, Mono)	Harmony (4)	HL 7300	1963		
More Favorites By The Carter Family (LP, Album, Mono)	Decca	DL 4557	1965		
The Famous Carter Family   2 versions	Harmony (4)		1970		
More Golden Gems From The Original Carter Family (LP)	RCA	CAS-2554 (e)	1972			
'Mid The Green Fields Of Virginia   3 versions	RCA		1963		
The Original Carter Family From 1936 Radio Transcripts  2 versions	Old Homestead Records		1975			
The Original Carter Family Legendary Performers, Volume 1 (LP)	RCA	CPM1-2763	1979		
Clinch Mountain Treasures   2 versions	County Records, Sony Music Special Products		1991		
Carter Family Favorites (CD, Album, Alb)	Jasmine Records	JASMCD 3592	2009		
A. P. Carter Memorial Album (7", Album)	Acme Records (6)	CF-105	Unknown		
Country Favorites (LP, Album, Mono)	Sunset Records	SUM-1153	Unknown		
The Carter Family In Texas Volume 7 (LP)	Old Homestead Records	OHCS 139	Unknown		
Look! (LP)	Old Time Classics	6001	Unknown		
Country Sounds Of The Original Carter Family (LP, Mono)	Harmony (4)	HL 7422	Unknown		
Home Among The Hills (LP, Album)	Harmony (4)	HL 7344	Unknown		
Diamonds In The Rough (LP, Album)	Copper Creek Records	CCLP-0107	Unknown		
Great Sacred Songs (LP)	Harmony (4)	HL 7396	Unknown		
Gold Watch And Chain Vol. 3 (LP)	Anthology Of Country Music	ACM 22	Unknown		
A Sacred Collection (LP)	Anthology Of Country Music	ACM - 8	Unknown		
Early Classics (LP)	Anthology Of Country Music	ACM-15	Unknown

Compilations

Carter Family, The, Uncle Dave Macon, Gid Tanner & Riley Puckett - Authentic Country Music (LP, Comp, Mono)	RCA Camden	CDN-5111	1963		
Blackwood Brothers Quartet*, Stuart Hamblen, Original Carter Family, The*, Statesmen Quartet, The, Porter Wagoner, Speer Family, The - All-Night Sing (LP, Comp)	RCA Camden	CAL 767	1963		
The Best Of   3 versions	Columbia		1965		
Carter Family, The Featuring A. P. Carter - Lonesome Pine Special  2 versions	RCA Camden		1971		
My Old Cottage Home   2 versions	RCA Camden		1973		
The Legendary Collection (1927-'34, '41) (10xLP, Comp, Mono + Box)	RCA	RA5641-50	1974		
Original Carter Family, The* Featuring A.P. Carter* - The Happiest Days Of All (LP, Comp, RM)	RCA Camden	ACL1-0501(e)	1974		
The Original Carter Family In Texas Volume 2   2 versions	Old Homestead Records		1978		
Gospel Songs By The Carter Family In Texas / Volume 3 (LP, Comp, Mono)	Old Homestead Records	OHCS 116	1978		
Country & Western Classics (3xLP, Comp + Box)	Time Life Records	TLCW-06	1982		
The Original Carter Family In Texas Volume 5 (LP, Comp, Ltd)	Old Homestead Records	OHCS 130	1984		
The Original Carter Family In Texas Volume I (LP, Comp)	Old Homestead Records	OHCS 111	1984		
Volume 4 (LP, Comp)	Old Homestead Records	OHCS-117	1984		
20 Of The Best (LP, Comp)	RCA International	NL 89369	1984		
The Country Music Hall Of Fame (CD, Comp)	MCA Records	MCAD-10088	1991		
The Country Music Hall Of Fame (CD, Comp, Club)	MCA Records	MCAD-10088	1991		
My Clinch Mountain Home: Their Complete Victor Recordings (1928-1929) (CD, Comp)	Rounder Records	CD 1065	1993		
Anchored in Love: Their Complete Victor Recordings (1927-1928) (CD, Comp)	Rounder Records	CD 1064	1993		
Worried Man Blues: Their Complete Victor Recordings (1930) (CD, Comp)	Rounder Records	CD 1067	1995		
When the Roses Bloom in Dixieland: Their Complete Victor Recordings (1929-1930) (CD, Comp)	Rounder Records	CD 1066	1995		
On Border Radio, Vol. 1 (CD, Comp)	Arhoolie Records, Arhoolie Records	CD 411, 411	1995		
Sunshine in the Shadows: Their Complete Victor Recordings (1931-1932) (CD, Comp)	Rounder Records	CD 1068	1996		
Greatest Hits (CD, Comp)	KRB Music Companies	KRB5155-2	1997		
Give Me the Roses While I Live: Their Complete Victor Recordings (1932-1933) (CD, Comp)	Rounder Records	CD 1069	1997		
Best Of The Best Of The Original Carter Family (CD, Comp)	King Records (3), King Records (3), BMG Special Products	KCD-1478, KSCD-1478, DRC11839	1997		
On Border Radio, Vol. 2 (CD, Comp)	Arhoolie Records, Arhoolie Records	CD 412, 412	1997		
Last Sessions: Their Complete Victor Recordings (1934-1941) (CD, Comp)	Rounder Records	CD 1072	1998		
Longing for Old Virginia: Their Complete Victor Recordings (1934) (CD, Comp)	Rounder Records	CD 1071	1998		
Gold Watch and Chain: Their Complete Victor Recordings (1933-1934) (CD, Comp)	Rounder Records	CD 1070	1998		
On Border Radio, Vol. 3 (CD, Comp)	Arhoolie Records, Arhoolie Records	CD 413, 413	1999		
The Best Of The Carter Family (CD, Comp)	Prism Leisure	PLATCD 548	1999		
Can The Circle Be Unbroken: Country Music's First Family   2 versions	Columbia, Legacy		2000		
Famous Country Music Makers (CD, Comp)	Castle Pulse	PLS CD 358	2000		
The Best Of The Carter Family Volume Two (Wildwood Flower) (CD, Comp)	Country Stars	CTS 55465	2000		
In The Shadow Of Clinch Mountain (12xCD, Comp + Box)	Bear Family Records	BCD 15865 LK	2000		
Wildwood Flower (CD, Comp, Mono)	ASV, Living Era	CD AJA 5323	2000		
1927-1934   3 versions	JSP Records		2001		
The Decca Sessions Volume One (1936) (CD, Comp)	Catfish Records	KATCD188X	2001		
The Decca Sessions Vol. II (CD, Comp)	Catfish Records	KATCD218	2002		
Country & Folk Roots (CD, Comp)	Castle Pulse	PLSCD 651	2003		
Volume 2: 1935-1941 (5xCD, Comp, RM + Box)	JSP Records	JSP7708	2003		
RCA Country Legends (CD, Album, Comp)	BMG Heritage	82876 59266 2	2004		
A Proper Introduction To The Carter Family - Keep On The Sunny Side (CD, Comp, RM)	Proper Records Ltd.	INTRO CD 2060	2004		
The Best Of The Carter Family (2xCD, Comp)	Performance (7)	38126	2005		
The Best Of The Carter Family (CD, Comp, Club)	MCA Nashville, Decca	B0004544-02	2005		
Can The Circle Be Unbroken (2xCD, Comp, RM)	Primo (2), Primo (2)	PRMCD 6014, PRMCD6014	2006		
The Carter Family (CD, Comp)	Direct Source Special Products Inc.	AD 59012	2006		
Wildwood Flower (CD, Comp)	Weton-Wesgram	LATA188	2007		
Country Folk (4xCD, Comp, Album + Box)	Proper Records Ltd.	PROPERBOX 127	2007		
Wildwood Flower (2xCD, Comp)	Not Now Music	NOT2CD280	2008		
The Carter Family (Roots Of Country) (2xCD, Comp)	Music Club Deluxe	MCDLX102	2009		
I'm Thinking Tonight Of My Blue Eyes (LP, Comp)	Monk (4)	MK314	2010		
Bring Back My Blue-Eyed Boy To Me (LP, Comp)	Monk (4)	MK332	2010		
Greatest Hits 1927-1934 (CDr, Comp)	Fabulous (3)	FABCD146	2011		
American Epic: The Best of The Carter Family (Digital download)	Lo-Max, Sony Legacy 2017
The Carter Family On Border Radio (LP, Comp, Mono)	John Edwards Memorial Foundation	JEMF 101	Unknown		
The Original Carter Family In Texas Volume 6 (LP, Comp, Ltd)	Old Homestead Records	OHCS 136	Unknown		
Volume 3 (LP, Comp)	CMH Records	CMH 116	Unknown		
Volume 2 (LP, Comp)	CMH Records	CMH 112	Unknown		
Famous Country-Music Makers (2xLP, Comp, Gat)	RCA	DPM 2046	Unknown		
Volume 1 (LP, Comp)	CMH Records	CMH 107	Unknown		
Volume 4 (LP, Comp)	CMH Records	CMH 118	Unknown		
Famous Country Music Makers (LP, Comp, Mono)	RCA Victor	DPM 2046	Unknown

References

Country music discographies
Discographies of American artists